Ginigathena  is a small town in Sri Lanka located within Central Province in the Nuwara Eliya District. It is the central point to reach Hatton and Nawalapitiya. The Beauty of Tea Estates of Nuwara Eliya District starts from Ginigathena. Ginigathena is populated with Sinhalese and Tamils. Aberdeen Falls, one of the least known waterfalls of Sri Lanka is situated in Ginigathena. One of the very few real tree houses and the only pine tree house of Sri Lanka, "The Tree House"  and Hotel Breeta's Garden also situated in Ginigathena. Ginigathena has the majesty of accumulating the branches of Kelani and Mahaweli rivers.

Climate
Ginigathena receives the highest rainfall in Sri Lanka.

See also
List of towns in Central Province, Sri Lanka

References

External links

Populated places in Nuwara Eliya District